Congleton is a civil parish in Cheshire East, England. It contains 133 buildings that are recorded in the National Heritage List for England as designated listed buildings.  Of these, one is listed at Grade I, the highest grade, four are listed at Grade II*, the middle grade, and the others are at Grade II. The parish contains the town of Congleton, and surrounding countryside.  Passing through the parish are the Macclesfield Canal and the River Dane, and a number of listed structures are associated with these waterways.  The silk and cotton weaving industries came to the town from the 18th century, and there are listed buildings associated with these, including mills and weavers' cottages.  Otherwise the listed buildings include houses and cottages in the town and the country, churches and associated structures, shops, schools, a town hall, offices, and public houses.  Some of the buildings date from the 16th and 17th centuries, and are timber-framed.  The great majority of houses are from the late 18th and early 19th centuries, reflecting the industrial growth and prosperity in the town at this time.

Key

Buildings

See also
Listed buildings in Cheshire
Listed buildings in Bosley
Listed buildings in North Rode
Listed buildings in Eaton
Listed buildings in Hulme Walfield
Listed buildings in Somerford
Listed buildings in Newbold Astbury
Listed buildings in Rushton, Staffordshire
Listed buildings in Biddulph, Staffordshire

List of textile mills in Cheshire
Silk industry of Cheshire

References
Citations

Sources

 

 

Listed buildings in the Borough of Cheshire East
Lists of listed buildings in Cheshire